Julia Ralph Scott (born 27 November 1982) is a Scottish female international football midfielder. She currently plays for Scottish Women's Premier League team Forfar Farmington, having previously played in the FA WSL for Doncaster Rovers Belles. Ralph Scott made her senior Scotland debut in 2000 and made 14 appearances for the national team.

Club career
Ralph Scott graduated from Edinburgh Napier University in July 2004. That summer she played for Hibernian in the UEFA Women's Cup before departing to Fairleigh Dickinson University.

While playing varsity soccer, Ralph Scott was coached by Hubert Busby, Jr. who recommended her to W-League outfit Toronto Lady Lynx.

After returning to Scotland Ralph Scott featured for Aberdeen, Celtic Ladies and Forfar Farmington before signing for English FA WSL club Doncaster Rovers Belles in July 2011. At the culmination of the 2011 FA WSL season, Ralph Scott returned to Forfar Farmington.

International career
In September 2000, while playing for Elgin, 17-year–old Ralph Scott was called up to the senior Scotland squad for the first time. She travelled with the team for a friendly in the Netherlands. She had previously won 20 Under–18 caps and five at Under–16 level.

Ralph Scott won an eventual 14 caps at senior level before departing to America.

Personal life
Ralph Scott was an accomplished ballerina during her younger years. She is nicknamed Ralphi.

References

External links
Julie Ralph Scott at Doncaster Rovers Belles FC

1982 births
Living people
Scottish women's footballers
Footballers from Inverness
Scotland women's international footballers
Celtic F.C. Women players
Doncaster Rovers Belles L.F.C. players
Hibernian W.F.C. players
Women's association football wingers
Forfar Farmington F.C. players
Fairleigh Dickinson University alumni
Aberdeen F.C. Women players
Fairleigh Dickinson Knights women's soccer players
Scottish Women's Premier League players
Scottish expatriate women's footballers
Scottish expatriate sportspeople in the United States
Expatriate women's soccer players in the United States
Women's Super League players